Jérémy Berthod (born 24 April 1984) is a French former professional footballer who played as a left-back. He is the trainer of Ain Sud for the 2022-2023 season.

Career
Berthod was born in Tassin-la-Demi-Lune, Rhône. A product of the Olympique Lyonnais youth academy, he made his first team debut on 13 September 2003 in a 1–1 home draw against Auxerre. He went on to play a somewhat important part in the team's four consecutive Ligue 1 titles, and was also a regular selection for the France U-21 squad during that timeframe.

In July 2007, l'OL agreed to transfer Berthod to AS Monaco for a fee of €2m. He made his Monaco debut in the season's second round, a 2–1 defeat at Lorient – picking up a yellow card in the process – and finished the season with 12 league contests played.

After an unimpressive year at Monaco, Berthod made a summer move to Auxerre. Over the course of four top flight seasons he was used solely as a backup, being released at the end of 2011–12 as his team ranked 20th and last.

On 4 February 2013, aged nearly 29, Berthod moved abroad for the first time, signing a two-year contract with Norwegian club Sarpsborg 08.

On 19 March 2015, he re-joined lyon as semi-amateur to help team with many injuries.

He is the trainer of Ain Sud for the 2022-2023 season.

Personal life
Berthod's younger brother, Alexandre Berthod, was also a footballer (and a defender), and also briefly represented Lyon.

Career statistics

Honours
Lyon
 Ligue 1: 2003–04, 2004–05, 2005–06, 2006–07
 Trophée des Champions: 2004, 2005, 2006

France U-17
 FIFA U-17 World Championship: 2001

References

External links

1984 births
Living people
People from Tassin-la-Demi-Lune
French footballers
Association football defenders
France youth international footballers
France under-21 international footballers
Olympique Lyonnais players
AS Monaco FC players
AJ Auxerre players
Sarpsborg 08 FF players
Ligue 1 players
Eliteserien players
French expatriate footballers
French expatriate sportspeople in Norway
Expatriate footballers in Norway
Ain Sud managers
Sportspeople from Lyon Metropolis
Footballers from Auvergne-Rhône-Alpes